Zamarada differens is a moth of the family Geometridae first described by Max Bastelberger in 1907. It is found in subtropical Africa and is known from the Central African Republic, Chad, the Comoros, Kenya, Malawi, Mozambique, South Africa, Tanzania, Uganda, Zambia and Zimbabwe.

The forewings and hindwings of this species are yellow greenish and it has a wingspan of 20 mm.

References

Abraxini
Moths described in 1907
Moths of Sub-Saharan Africa
Moths of the Comoros